Carlo Masala (born 27 March 1968) is professor for International Politics at the Bundeswehr University Munich, lecturer at the University of Munich, as well as lecturer and member of the senate of Munich School of Political Science.

Education
Masala was born in Cologne. From 1988 to 1992 he studied in Cologne and Bonn political sciences as well as German studies and Romance studies. After having finished his Master's degree, he started to work as researcher in Cologne. In 1996 he graduated at the Institute for Political Sciences and European Issues with a doctoral thesis on German-Italian Relations. In 2002 he was awarded his habilitation in political sciences.

Career
In 2003 Masala was temporarily employed as professor at the University of Munich, and in 2004 he started to work at the NATO Defence College in Rome. From 2006 to 2007 he used to be assistant director of research at the college.
In July 2007 Masala took a chair of international politics at the Bundeswehr University Munich 

Masala considers himself a neorealist. His main research areas are theories of international politics, security politics as well as transatlantic relations.

Other activities
 Federal Academy for Security Policy (BAKS), Member of the Advisory Board (since 2015)

References

External links
Chair of Prof. Masala

Living people
1968 births
International relations scholars
German political scientists
Political realists
Writers from Cologne
Academic staff of Bundeswehr University Munich